Noelle Murray (born 25 December 1989) is an Irish professional footballer who plays as a forward for Irish club Shelbourne and the Republic of Ireland national team. Between 2011 and 2016 Murray played in six successive FAI Women's Cup finals with three clubs - St Catherine's, Raheny United and Shelbourne Ladies.

Club career

Early career
On 14 October 2007 at Dalymount Park, together with Niamh Reid Burke and Olivia O'Toole, Murray was a member of the Raheny United team that lost 1–0 to the Galway Ladies League in the FAI Women's Cup final. Murray scored twice for St Catherine's in the 2011 FAI Women's Cup final played at Turners Cross. St Catherine's claimed the cup with a dramatic 3-1 victory over Wilton United. Mary Waldron scored the opening goal in the 43rd minute before Murray doubled the score in the 77th minute with an astonishing volley. However, Wilton hit back in the closing moments of the game through Denise O'Sullivan but their late comeback was short lived as Murray ended the contest with another impressive strike in the 89th minute. Together with Nicola Sinnott, Murray was a member of Shamrock Rovers squad during the inaugural 2011–12 Women's National League season.

Raheny United
The 2012–13 season saw Murray return to Raheny United. Over the next three seasons, together with Niamh Reid Burke, Siobhán Killeen, Clare Shine and Katie McCabe, Murray was a prominent member of the successful United team that won two Women's National League titles and three FAI Women's Cup finals. In the 2012 final United clinched the cup with a 90th-minute winner from Murray. Murray also scored three goals for Raheny United in their 2013–14 and 2014–15 UEFA Women's Champions League campaigns.

Shelbourne Ladies
During the 2015–16 season Murray played for Shelbourne Ladies, helping them finish as runners-up in the FAI Women's Cup, the WNL Shield and the Women's National League. Murray's goals also helped Shelbourne Ladies win the WNL Cup. In the semi-final she scored a hat-trick in a 4–2 win over Wexford Youths. In the final she scored twice in a 3–2 win over UCD Waves at Richmond Park. In the 2016 FAI Women's Cup, Murray scored again as she helped Shelbourne to a 5–0 win over Wexford Youths.

Glasgow City
Murray left Shelbourne in January 2017, signing her first professional contract with Scottish Women's Premier League champions Glasgow City.

Shelbourne Ladies
In March 2018, Noelle re-joined Shelbourne Ladies.

International career
Murray has represented the Republic of Ireland at under 17, under 19 and senior level. In a UEFA Women's Under-19 Championship qualifier on 26 April 2008, Murray came on as a substitute for Julie-Ann Russell in the 72nd minute against Serbia and scored twice in a 7–0 win. Murray made her senior international debut on 9 March 2007 when she came on as a substitute in a 2007 Algarve Cup game against Iceland. She also played against Portugal  and  Italy in the same tournament. Murray was also a member of the Republic of Ireland squads for the  2008 Algarve Cup, the UEFA Women's Euro 2009 qualifying campaign and the 2013 Cyprus Cup.

Honours
Raheny United
 Women's National League: 2012–13, 2013–14
FAI Women's Cup: 2012, 2013, 2014
Runners-up: 2007
WNL Cup: 2015
Shelbourne
FAI Women's Cup: 2016
Runners-up: 2015
WNL Cup: 2016
St Catherine's
FAI Women's Cup: 2011

Glasgow City
 Scottish Women's Premier League: 2017

References

1989 births
Living people
Republic of Ireland women's association footballers
Republic of Ireland women's international footballers
Women's association football forwards
Raheny United F.C. players
Shamrock Rovers Ladies F.C. players
Shelbourne F.C. (women) players
St Catherine's L.F.C. players
Women's National League (Ireland) players
Glasgow City F.C. players
Scottish Women's Premier League players
Republic of Ireland women's youth international footballers